The Sokol International Racetrack (also known as Sokol Circuit -) is a motorsport race track  northwest of Almaty, Kazakhstan. The  circuit was designed by Hermann Tilke and is marketed as an FIA Grade 2 track.

History
In July 2012, Kazakh businessman Alijan Ibragimov announced plans to build a US$40 million (KZ₸19 billion) motorsport facility on the outskirts of Almaty, the largest city in Kazakhstan, with construction scheduled to commence in September. RacingLoop were brought in as consultants and Hermann Tilke was charged with the design of a circuit intended to draw in MotoGP and the Deutsche Tourenwagen Masters, however ground was not broken until 2014.

By 2016 a go-kart track and a drag strip had been opened with Jorge Lorenzo in attendance, as circuit construction was well underway. Construction had progressed as far as electronic and timing installation by early 2019 before it ground to a halt due to political issues.

On 27 September 2022, it was announced that the circuit would host the Kazakhstan motorcycle Grand Prix until at least 2028 starting in 2023.

References

External links
 Official website

Grand Prix motorcycle circuits
Sports venues in Kazakhstan
Sokol